The Lord Chamberlain's requirements were a set of four prerequisites for a licence for a production in British theatres. These were printed in theatre programmes so the audience could be aware of them. The Lord Chamberlain's Office had control of theatres until 1968, including censorship of the production content as well as for logistical matters. In the 1980s, they were replaced by similar requirements applied by a local licensing authority.

The original regulations were officially known as the Lord Chamberlain's Regulations, but as they were printed in every programme as "The Lord Chamberlain's Requirements", this became their accepted name.

The requirements cover:
 Leaving the theatre at the end of the performance.
 Freedom of gangways and passages from obstruction.
 Limitations on standees.
 Operation of the safety curtain during each performance.

Three of the requirements (leaving the theatre, freedom of the gangways and the operation of the safety curtain) were set to music by Donald Swann for the revue Fresh Airs and were later used as encores for the Flanders and Swann revue At the Drop of a Hat.

References
  London Theatre programmes of the period 1948 to 2008

Theatre in the United Kingdom